Tigers Are Bad For Horses is an American band that formed in 2014 in Washington DC. Their music has been categorized as electronica and alt pop, although many observers note distinct jazz influences.

The band consists of Lyell Evans Roeder and Mary Ellen Funke, who met at Georgetown University.

Discography
Recovery (2014)
TABFH (2015)
Embers (2016)
Still Here (2018)

References

External links
 Tigers Are Bad For Horses official site
 

Indie pop groups from Washington, D.C.